Bordetella pertussis is a Gram-negative, aerobic, pathogenic, encapsulated coccobacillus of the genus Bordetella, and the causative agent of pertussis or whooping cough. Like B. bronchiseptica, B. pertussis is motile and expresses a flagellum-like structure. Its virulence factors include pertussis toxin, adenylate cyclase toxin, filamentous hæmagglutinin, pertactin, fimbria, and tracheal cytotoxin.

The bacterium is spread by airborne droplets; its incubation period is 7–10 days on average (range 6–20 days).  Humans are the only known reservoir for B. pertussis. The complete B. pertussis genome of 4,086,186 base pairs was published in 2003. Compared to its closest relative B. bronchiseptica, the genome size is greatly reduced. This is mainly due to the adaptation to one host species (human) and the loss of capability of survival outside of a host body.

History 
The disease pertussis was first described by French physician Guillaume de Baillou after the epidemic of 1578. The causative agent of pertussis was identified and isolated by Jules Bordet and  Octave Gengou in 1906.

Taxonomy 
The genus Bordetella contains nine species: B. pertussis B. parapertussis, B. bronchiseptica, B. avium, B. hinzii, B. holmesii, B. trematum, B. ansorpii and B. petrii.

B. pertussis, B. parapertussis and B. bronchiseptica form a closely related phylogenetical group. B. parapertussis causes a disease similar to whooping cough in humans, and B. bronchiseptica infects a range of mammal hosts, including humans, and causes a spectrum of respiratory disorders.

Pertussis

Pertussis is an infection of the respiratory system characterized by a “whooping” sound when the person breathes in. In the US, it killed between 10,000 and 20,000 people per year before a vaccine was available. Vaccination has transformed this; between 1985 and 1988, fewer than 100 children died from pertussis. Worldwide in 2000, according to the WHO, around 39 million people were infected annually and about 297,000 died. Since the introduction of vaccination in England in 1957, the rate of pertussis infection has dropped by 97%. 

B. pertussis infects its host by colonizing lung epithelial cells. The bacterium contains a surface protein, filamentous haemagglutinin adhesin, which binds to the sulfatides found on cilia of epithelial cells. Other adhesins are fimbriae and petractin. Once anchored, the bacterium produces tracheal cytotoxin, which stops the cilia from beating. This prevents the cilia from clearing debris from the lungs, so the body responds by sending the host into a coughing fit. These coughs expel some bacteria into the air, which can then infect other hosts.

B. pertussis has the ability to inhibit the function of the host's immune system. The toxin, known as pertussis toxin (or PTx), inhibits G protein coupling that regulates an adenylate cyclase-mediated conversion of ATP to cyclic AMP. The end result is that phagocytes convert too much ATP to cAMP, causing disturbances in cellular signaling mechanisms, and preventing phagocytes from correctly responding to the infection. PTx, formerly known as lymphocytosis-promoting factor, causes a decrease in the entry of lymphocytes into lymph nodes, which can lead to a condition known as lymphocytosis, with a complete lymphocyte count of over 4000/μl in adults or over 8000/μl in children. Beside targeting lymphocytes, it limits neutrophil migration to the lungs. It also decreases the function of tissue-resident macrophages, which are responsible for some bacterial clearance.

Another toxin that inhibits the immune response is the adenylate cyclase toxin. This toxin has an intrinsic adenylate cyclase activity, increasing intracellular cAMP almost immediately. It is also able to form cation-specific pores in the membrane of the target cell. The resulting deregulation of cell signaling leads to blocking of phagocytosis and reduction in the ability of neutrophils to kill bacteria. It also inhibits maturation of dendritic cells and their migration to the lymph nodes.

The infection occurs mostly in children under the age of one when they are unimmunized, or children with faded immunity, normally around the ages 11 through 18. The signs and symptoms are similar to a common cold: runny nose, sneezing, mild cough, and low-grade fever. The patient becomes most contagious during the catarrhal stage of infection, normally two weeks after the coughing begins. It may become airborne when the person coughs, sneezes, or laughs.  The paroxysmal cough precedes a crowing inspiratory sound characteristic of pertussis. After a spell, the patient might make a “whooping” sound when breathing in, or may vomit. Adults have milder symptoms, such as prolonged coughing without the “whoop”. Infants less than six months also may not have the typical whoop. A coughing spell may last a minute or more, producing cyanosis, apnoea, and seizures. However, when not in a coughing fit, the patient does not experience trouble breathing. This is because B. pertussis inhibits the immune response, so very little mucus is generated in the lungs.

A prolonged cough may be irritating and sometimes a disabling cough may go undiagnosed in adults for many months.

Prevention 
Pertussis vaccine has been widely used since the second half of the 20th century. The first vaccines were whole-cell vaccines, composed of chemically inactivated bacteria. They are being replaced by acellular vaccines, composed of purified surface antigens, mainly fimbriae, filamentous haemaglutinin, pertactin and pertussis toxin. It is part of the diphtheria, tetanus, and acellular pertussis (DTaP) immunization.

As a zoonotic disease
Uncertainties of B. pertussis and whooping cough as a zoonotic disease have existed since around 1910, but in the 1930s, the bacteria were found to have lost their virulent power when repeatedly spread on agar media. This explained the difficulties in reproducing results from different studies, as the preinoculation handling of the bacteria was not standardized among scientists.

At least some primate species are highly sensitive to B. pertussis, and develop a clinical whooping cough in high incidence when exposed to low inoculation doses. Whether the bacteria spread naturally in wild animal populations has not been confirmed satisfactorily by laboratory diagnosis, but whooping cough has been found among wild gorillas. Several zoos have learned to vaccinate their primates against whooping cough.

Diagnosis
A nasopharyngeal or an oropharynx swab is sent to the bacteriology laboratory for Gram stain (Gram-negative, coccobacilli, diplococci arrangement), growth on Bordet–Gengou agar or BCYE plate with added cephalosporin to select for the organism, which shows mercury drop-like colonies.  B. pertussis can also be detected by PCR, which is more sensitive than culture. The primers used for PCR usually target the transposable elements IS481 and IS1001.

Several diagnostic tests are available, especially ELISA kits. These are designed to detect FHA and/or PT antibodies of IgG, IgA, or IgM. Some kits use a combination of antigens which  lead to a higher sensitivity, but might also make the interpretation of the results harder, since one cannot know which antibody has been detected.

The organism is oxidase positive, but urease, nitrate reductase, and citrate negative. It is also 
motile.

Treatment 
Whooping cough is treated by macrolides, for example erythromycin. The therapy is most effective when started during the incubation period or the catarrhal period. When applied during the paroxysmal cough phase, the time of reconvalescence is not affected, only further transmission is prevented.

References

External links

Type strain of Bordetella pertussis at BacDive—the Bacterial Diversity Metadatabase

Burkholderiales
Whooping cough
Bacteria described in 1952